Five Rivers MetroParks is a regional public park system consisting of conservatories and outdoor recreation and education facilities that serve the Dayton metropolitan area. The name Five Rivers MetroParks comes from five major waterways that converge in Dayton. These waterways are the Great Miami River, Mad River, Stillwater River, Wolf Creek, and Twin Creek. These include hiking trails, a mountain bike area (MoMBA) at Huffman MetroPark, horse bridle trails, a disc golf course, a whitewater feature at Eastwood MetroPark, and a large butterfly house at Cox Arboretum MetroPark. Five Rivers MetroParks provides year-round recreation, education and conservation opportunities to the Greater Dayton community.

The fountain at RiverScape Metropark shoots  of water per minute toward the center of the river. The central geyser of the fountain rises from the jets 200 ft (60 m) in the air. Covering 395,000 square feet (36,700 square meters) across an 800 ft (244 m) diameter, the Five Rivers Fountain of Lights is one of the largest fountains in the world.

Five Rivers MetroParks also operates the 2nd Street Market, a public market located on East Second Street near downtown Dayton. More than 200,000 people visit the market year-round. Local merchants sell produce, flowers, baked goods, as well as homemade food and craft items. Entertainment includes local musicians, singers and dancers.

Metropark facilities
The Metropark's 19 facilities are:

 Aullwood Garden MetroPark, Englewood
 Carriage Hill MetroPark, Huber Heights
 Cox Arboretum and Gardens MetroPark, Dayton
 Deeds Point MetroPark, Dayton
 Eastwood MetroPark, Riverside
 Englewood MetroPark, Englewood
 Germantown MetroPark, Germantown
 Hills & Dales MetroPark, Kettering
 Huffman MetroPark, Fairborn
 Island MetroPark, Dayton
 Possum Creek MetroPark, Dayton
 RiverScape MetroPark, Dayton
 2nd Street Market, Dayton
 Sugarcreek MetroPark, Sugarcreek Township
 Sunrise MetroPark, Dayton
 Taylorsville MetroPark, Vandalia
 Twin Creek MetroPark, Germantown
 Wegerzyn Gardens MetroPark, Dayton
 Wesleyan MetroPark, Dayton

The Metropark's 8 conservation area's include:

 Dull Woods Conservation Area
 Medlar Conservation Area (added December 2010)
 Needmore Conservation Area
 Pigeye Conservation Area
 Sandridge Prairie Conservation Area
 Shiloh Woods Conservation Area
 Twin Valley Conservation Area
 Woodman Fen Conservation Area

References

External links
 

Park districts in Ohio
Urban public parks
Protected areas of Montgomery County, Ohio
Tourist attractions in Montgomery County, Ohio
Tourist attractions in Dayton, Ohio